The Unique Domain Authentication Identifier (UDAI) is a case-sensitive, eight-character-long "password" which is a randomly generated unique identifier for every Internet NZ domain name (code ".nz"). The UDAI is made up of letters in both upper and lower case as well as numbers.

The UDAI is the password for the domain and can be used to transfer the ownership of the domain.

When an Internet domain name is registered, the related UDAI is initially generated. However, a new UDAI can be requested by the owner at any time. Registrars are obliged to promptly make UDAIs available to registrants upon request and may not withhold them to prevent a domain name from being transferred under any circumstances.

The term UDAI is a term only used in New Zealand.  Other countries still require a unique code to transfer a domain, but refer to it as an Auth code or EPP code.

References 

Domain Name System